Infotainment? is the third album by the band Pitchshifter, released in 1996.

There was a bonus disc called Exploitainment which was only given away with the Infotainment? limited festival edition. The disc also featured a CD ROM Video Section for the songs: "Underachiever", "Triad", and "Deconstruction" and 2 audio tracks: "Underachiever (0990 243003 Mix)" and "Product Placement (Disinformation Mix)".

Track listing

 Track 0 "Data Track" is a CD-ROM track.

Credits
Pitchshifter
 J.S. Clayden - lead vocals
 Johnny A. Carter - guitars, programming
 Mark Clayden - bass
 D.J. Walters - drums

Production
 J.S. Clayden, Omni-Design, Fluid and Alex CRi - artwork
 Ewan Davies - engineering (tracks 1 to 7 and 9)
 J.A. Carter - programming
 Kevin Metcalfe - mastering
 Andrea Wright, Ric Peet - mixing (tracks 1 to 7, 8 and 9)
 Ralph Barklam - photographer
 Pitchshifter and Simon Efemey - production
 Pitchshifter - writer

Exploitainment?

This is a bonus disc which was given away in 1999 with the Infotainment? re-release.

The disc also featured a CD ROM Video Section for the songs:
"Underachiever," "Triad," and "Deconstruction."

Track listings

"Underachiever (0990 243003 Mix)"
"Product Placement (Disinformation Mix)"

References

Pitchshifter albums
1996 albums
Earache Records albums